Chibisovka is a rural locality in Rusanovsky Selsoviet Rural Settlement, Fatezhsky District, Kursk Oblast, Russia. Population:

Geography 
The village is located on the Usozha River (a left tributary of the Svapa in the basin of the Seym) and its tributary, Verkhny Khoteml Brook, 100 km from the Russia–Ukraine border, 45 km north-west of Kursk, 2.5 km south-west of the district center – the town Fatezh, 1.5 km from the selsoviet center – Basovka.

 Climate
Chibisovka has a warm-summer humid continental climate (Dfb in the Köppen climate classification).

Transport 
Chibisovka is located 0.3 km from the federal route  Crimea Highway as part of the European route E105, 2.5 km from the road of regional importance  (Fatezh – Dmitriyev), on the road of intermunicipal significance  (M2 "Crimea Highway" – Chibisovka), 32.5 km from the nearest railway halt 29 km (railway line Arbuzovo – Luzhki-Orlovskiye).

The rural locality is situated 48 km from Kursk Vostochny Airport, 166 km from Belgorod International Airport and 236 km from Voronezh Peter the Great Airport.

References

Notes

Sources

Rural localities in Fatezhsky District